Norway has an embassy in Canberra. The embassy was established in 1947. The embassy has dual accreditations to all the other nations of Oceania. Norway also has ten honorary consulates in Oceania, five of which are in Australia alone.

See also 
 Norway Australia relations
 Norway New Zealand relations

References

External links 
 

Norway
Canberra
Australia–Norway relations
New Zealand–Norway relations